Moira Linehan is an American poet born in 1945. She graduated from Boston College, and Vermont College of Fine Arts, with an MFA.
She lived in Winchester, Massachusetts, where she worked as an academic administrator. She has been a resident at the Virginia Center for the Creative Arts, and the Millay Colony.

Her work has appeared in Alaska Quarterly Review, Green Mountains Review, Indiana Review, and Notre Dame Review, Triquarterly.

Honors and awards
 2006 Crab Orchard Award
 2001 Honorable mention Thomas Merton Prize of Poetry of the Sacred

Published works

References

External links
 
  
 
 "The Design", Verse Daily
 "Understory", Boston College Magazine, Winter 2008
 

Year of birth missing (living people)
Living people
Boston College alumni
Vermont College of Fine Arts alumni
American women poets
21st-century American women